Michael Houser is a Republican member of the Kansas House of Representatives, representing the 1st district (Columbus, Kansas in Cherokee County, Kansas).  He has served since 2013. He lost the 2010 election after calling for a recount. He was given a lifetime evaluation of 88% by the American Conservative Union.

References

External links
 Campaign Homepage 
 Kansas Legislature Website
 Ballotpedia
 Influence Explorer
 Vote Smart
 Follow the Money
 Open States
 Our Campaigns

Republican Party members of the Kansas House of Representatives
Living people
People from Columbus, Kansas
21st-century American politicians
Year of birth missing (living people)